Anthony Cirelli (born July 15, 1997) is a Canadian professional ice hockey center who is currently playing for the Tampa Bay Lightning of the National Hockey League (NHL). He was selected by the Lightning in the third round (72nd overall) of the 2015 NHL Entry Draft.  Cirelli won back-to-back Stanley Cups with the Lightning in 2020 and 2021; he also played in the 2022 Stanley Cup Finals but Tampa lost to the Colorado Avalanche.

Playing career

Juniors

Cirelli started his junior career with the Oshawa Generals of the Ontario Hockey League. Cirelli went undrafted in the OHL draft, and would end up making the team as a walk-on. Cirelli scored the game-winning goal in overtime against the Kelowna Rockets in the 2015 Memorial Cup. On June 27, 2015, the Tampa Bay Lightning selected Cirelli 72nd overall in the 3rd round of the 2015 NHL Entry Draft. On January 28, 2016, Cirelli was named as captain of the Generals. On May 19, 2016, the Lightning signed Cirelli to a three-year entry level contract.

On January 9, 2017, Cirelli was traded by the Oshawa Generals to the Erie Otters. Cirelli scored another championship clinching goal in overtime, the 2017 J. Ross Robertson Cup winning goal for the Otters in Game 5 of the OHL championship series against the Mississauga Steelheads . However, the Otters would ultimately fall in the championship game of the 2017 Memorial Cup tournament to the host Windsor Spitfires.

Professional
On March 1, 2018, Cirelli was recalled by the Tampa Bay Lightning from the Syracuse Crunch of the American Hockey League. Prior to his recall Cirelli was enjoying a productive rookie season with the Crunch. He had appeared in 51 games where he had 14-goals and 37 points. Cirelli would make his NHL debut that night against the Dallas Stars at American Airlines Center. Cirelli recorded his first career NHL goal and assist in the game, which resulted in a 5–4 overtime win. Cirelli also became only the fourth player in Lightning history to have a multiple point game in their NHL debut. On April 12, 2018, Cirelli made his NHL Stanley Cup Playoff debut in a 5–2 Lightning victory over the visiting New Jersey Devils. On April 21, 2018, Cirelli recorded his first career playoff assist and point in a 3–1 Lightning series clinching win over the New Jersey Devils. On May 2, 2018, he recorded his first career playoff goal in a 4–1 win over the Boston Bruins. Building on his impressive overtime goal-scoring resume from his junior days, on September 17, 2020, he scored the winning goal in overtime of Game 6 of the Eastern Conference Finals against the New York Islanders.

On December 24, 2020, Cirelli signed a three-year, $14.4 million contract with the Lightning.

On July 13, 2022, Cirelli signed an eight-year, $50 million contract extension with the Lightning.  His teammates Mikhail Sergachev and Erik Cernak also signed eight-year extensions on the same day.

International play

On April 29, 2019, Cirelli was selected to make his full international debut after he was named to the Team Canada roster for the 2019 IIHF World Championship, held in Slovakia. He helped Canada progress through to the playoff rounds before losing the final to Finland to finish with the Silver Medal on May 26, 2019. Cirelli finished the tournament posting 3 goals and 4 points in 10 games. Cirelli also participated in the 2017 World Junior Championship with Canada, winning a silver medal.

Career statistics

Regular season and playoffs

International

Awards and honours

References

External links 

1997 births
Canadian ice hockey centres
Erie Otters players
Ice hockey people from Ontario
Living people
Oshawa Generals players
People from Vaughan
Stanley Cup champions
Syracuse Crunch players
Tampa Bay Lightning draft picks
Tampa Bay Lightning players